The Hyundai Mu engine is a variant of the 2.7 Liter Delta, the main difference with the Delta engine is the inclusion of the Continuous variable valve timing (CVVT).

General information
The Mu V6 (G6EA) is based on the Delta series and adopted some innovations of the parallel developed Lambda series , which was released in 2004 . This includes the CVVT, the changeover to mechanical bucket tappets and the almost identical cylinder head. The Mu is a 60 degree six cylinder and uses all aluminum block and heads. It features DOHC with 4 valves per cylinder, Variable intake system (VIS), Variable length intake runners (VLM) and Multi-Port Fuel Injection (MPi). The engines were built in Asan, Korea by Hyundai.

Compared to the predecessor Delta, the compression was increased slightly to 10.4, which led to an approximately three percent fuel saving (Compression ratio). The Mu utilizes a timing belt to drive the exhaust cams on each bank of the engine, with the intake cam sprocket driven by a chain. The CVVT mechanism in the Mu varies intake cam timing relative to the exhaust cam timing, which is fixed. This did not vary the valve lift nor duration.

Specifications

Applications

Petrol
 Hyundai Grandeur/Azera (TG) (2005–2011)
 Hyundai Santa Fe (CM) (2005–2010)
 Kia Cadenza/K7 (VG) (2009–2011)
 Kia Carnival/Sedona (VQ) (2006–2010)
 Kia Opirus (2007–2012)
 Kia Optima (MG) (2005–2010)
 Kia Rondo (UN) (2006–2013)

LPG
 Kia K7 (VG) (2009–2011)
 Kia Carnival (VQ) (2005–2011)
 Kia Opirus (2010–2012)
 Kia Sorento (XM) (2009–2010)

See also

 List of Hyundai engines

Sources
 Kia Motors America 
 Hyundai Motors Worldwide
 G6EA GSL 2.7

Mu
V6 engines

Gasoline engines by model